Spectral Hash is a  cryptographic hash function submitted to the NIST hash function competition by Gokay Saldamlı, Cevahir Demirkıran, Megan Maguire, Carl Minden, Jacob Topper, Alex Troesch, Cody Walker, Çetin Kaya Koç. It uses a Merkle–Damgård construction and employs several mathematical structures including finite fields and discrete Fourier transforms. The authors claim 512-bit hashes at 51.2 gigabits per second on a 100-MHz Virtex-4 FPGA.

Spectral hash is insecure; a method exists to generate arbitrary collisions in the hash state, and therefore in the final hash digest.

See also
 BLAKE
 Grøstl (Knudsen et al.)
 JH
 Keccak (Keccak team, Daemen et al.)
 Skein (Schneier et al.)

References

External links 
 The Spectral Hash web site

NIST hash function competition